Phil Thierri Sieben (born 20 June 1999) is a German professional footballer who plays as a midfielder for Eerste Divisie club Roda JC.

Career

SC Paderborn
Sieben played youth football for VfL Lüneburg, SC Paderborn and Schalke 04, before again returning to Paderborn in 2017. He suffered a knee injury in January 2017, sidelining him until September 2017. Towards the end of the 2017–18 season, he made his first appearances for SC Paderborn II in the Oberliga Westfalen. His debut for the reserves came on 21 April 2018, starting in a 4–2 loss to SV Lippstadt.

He was a permanent part of the reserves from the 2018–19 season, and he made a total of 45 appearances and seven goals for the team before leaving in 2020.

Fortuna Düsseldorf
On 6 July 2020, Sieben joined Fortuna Düsseldorf where he was set to become part of the reserve team. He made his debut for Fortuna Düsseldorf II in the Regionalliga West on 12 September 2020, starting in a 4–0 home win over VfB Homberg. On 25 November 2020, he scored his first goal for the reserves, opening the score against Borussia Mönchengladbach II in an eventual 2–1 victory.

In the 2021–22 season, he was promoted to the first team. He made his debut on 8 August 2021 in the first round of the DFB-Pokal, replacing Shinta Appelkamp in the 63rd minute of a 5–0 victory. Sieben made his debut in the 2. Bundesliga for Fortuna Düsseldorf on 23 October 2021 in a 3–1 win over Karlsruher SC, coming on as a substitute for Marcel Sobottka. In November 2021, Sieben pulled a hamstring which sidelined him for some time.

Roda JC
Sieben joined Eerste Divisie club Roda JC on 10 June 2022 after he had been scouted by Toine van Mierlo. He signed a contract for two seasons with an option for a third, joining on a free transfer.

Sieben made his debut in the Eerste Divisie for Roda in a 2–0 win against FC Dordrecht on 5 August 2022. On 28 October 2022, he scored his first goal for the club in a 4–1 victory against Jong Utrecht.

Career statistics

References

External links
 Profile at the Roda JC website
 

1999 births
Living people
People from Lüneburg
German footballers
Footballers from Lower Saxony
Association football midfielders
Oberliga (football) players
Regionalliga players
2. Bundesliga players
Eerste Divisie players
SC Paderborn 07 II players
SC Paderborn 07 players
FC Schalke 04 players
Fortuna Düsseldorf II players
Fortuna Düsseldorf players
Roda JC Kerkrade players
German expatriate footballers
German expatriate sportspeople in the Netherlands
Expatriate footballers in the Netherlands